Greg Hampton is an American record producer, guitarist, singer, and songwriter, who has worked on such albums as Alice Cooper's Along Came a Spider, Tommy Bolin's Whips and Roses, Lita Ford's Wicked Wonderland, and Eli Cook‘s Primitive Son. Hampton has also appeared as the member of several groups over the years, including Science Faxtion (with Bootsy Collins and Buckethead), the New Czars (with Adrian Belew), and Razorball (with Reeves Gabrels). In 2011, it was announced that Hampton had formed a new project, 9 Chambers, with ex-Monster Magnet guitarist Ed Mundell, Gov't Mule bassist Jorgen Carlsson, and ex-Black Sabbath/Dio/Heaven & Hell drummer Vinny Appice.

Hampton's guitar set-up consists of Fender Stratocasters, Fender Telecasters, Fernanedes Ravelles, Gibson Les Pauls, a Gibson 335, a Gibson Firebird VII, a Dan Electro Baritone, and a Roland/Fernandes Guitar Synthesizer. Hampton owns 45 guitars altogether, ten of which are equipped with Fernandes Sustainers, and also uses a Line 6 Spider/Bogner 100 Head, along with various pedals.

Hampton continues to be very involved in overseeing the legacy of Bolin's recordings. In addition to being interviewed for the Bolin biography Touched By Magic: The Tommy Bolin Story by author Greg Prato, Hampton has produced two volumes of the aforementioned Whips and Roses releases, as well as 2011's Teaser Deluxe. In 2012, Hampton co-produced (with Gov't Mule's Warren Haynes) a Tommy Bolin tribute album, Tommy Bolin and Friends: Great Gypsy Soul, which includes performances by Toto's Steve Lukather, Aerosmith's Brad Whitford, Alter Bridge's Myles Kennedy, Wilco's Nels Cline, the Allman Brothers' Derek Trucks, and Bolin's former Deep Purple bandmate, Glenn Hughes, among others.

Discography (in alphabetical order)
 Alice Cooper - Along Came a Spider
 Alice Cooper - Theatre of Death (DVD/CD)
 Becca - 2nd Chance
 Black Oak Arkansas - The Wild Bunch
 Black Oak Arkansas - Latest and Greatest
 Calvin Russell - In Spite Of It All
 Chantel - Trenchcoat Blues
 Craig Erickson - Shine
 Derringer, Bogert, Appice - D.B.A.
 Derringer, Bogert, Appice - The Sky is Falling
 Dr John - Next Hex
 Eli Cook - Primitive Son
 Jack Casady - Dream Factor
 Leon Hendrix - Tricked by The Sun
 Lita Ford - Wicked Wonderland
 Mojo Lingo - Words, Wire & Barbed Wire
 Pat Travers - Stick With What You Know (LIVE)
 Pat Travers - PT=MC2
 Razorball - Razorball
 Rebekkah Star - Alien Nation
 Ron Wood - Not For Beginners
 Science Faxtion - Living on Another Frequency
 Scott Holt -  Angels in Exile
 St.Jubilee - St. Jubilee
 The Entropy - The Kieff
 The New Czars - Doomsday Revolution
 THE Suffrajets - These Eyes
 The Tubes - Hoods From Outer Space
 Three Legged Dogg - Frozen Summer
 Tommy Bolin - Whips and Roses (VOL. 1)
 Tommy Bolin - Whips and Roses (VOL. 2)
 Tommy Bolin - Teaser Deluxe
 Travers and Appice - It Takes a Lot of Balls
 Travers and Appice - Live at The House of Blues
 Travers and Appice - Keep On Rockin (DVD)

References

External links
Official site
Official Myspace page
Official 9 Chambers site

Living people
American record producers
American rock guitarists
American male guitarists
Year of birth missing (living people)